The 1981 Ice Hockey World Championships took place in Sweden between 12 and 26 April 1981, with games being played in the arenas of Scandinavium in Gothenburg and Johanneshovs isstadion in Stockholm. Eight teams took part, first splitting into two groups of four, with the best two from each group advancing to the final group. These teams then play each other in the final round. This was the 47th World Championships, and also the 58th European Championships. The Soviet Union became World Champions for the 17th time, and also won their twentieth European title. Don Cherry commented, "This is the best Russian team I've ever seen."

The Dutch team had won Group C and Group B in successive years to play in this tournament, but did not fare well.  Their best game was a narrow one goal loss to the Americans, a goal scored on a penalty shot by Dave Christian with eleven seconds left. It was their first appearance at the top level since 1950 and they have not returned since.

World Championship Group A (Sweden)

First round

Group 1

Group 2

Final Round

Consolation round

The Netherlands were relegated to Group B.

World Championship Group B (Italy)
Played in Urtijëi 20–29 March.  The hosts went undefeated to win, led by former Pittsburgh Penguin and Edmonton Oiler Wayne Bianchin and backstopped by former Oiler Jim Corsi.

Italy was promoted to Group A, both Yugoslavia and Japan were relegated to Group C.

World Championship Group C (China PR)
Played in Beijing 6–15 March.

Both Austria and China were promoted to Group B.

Ranking and statistics

Tournament Awards
Best players selected by the directorate:
Best Goaltender:       Peter Lindmark
Best Defenceman:       Larry Robinson
Best Forward:          Alexander Maltsev
Media All-Star Team:
Goaltender:  Peter Lindmark
Defence:  Larry Robinson,  Valeri Vasiliev
Forwards:  Sergei Kapustin,  Sergei Makarov,  Alexander Maltsev

Final standings
The final standings of the tournament according to IIHF:

European championships final standings
The final standings of the European championships according to IIHF:

Fanfare of the Championships
The fanfare for the Championships was written by Benny Andersson (from ABBA) in 1981. It was later used as the jingle/opening theme for the television special Dick Cavett Meets ABBA aired later in 1981. Reference - Palm, Carl Magnus: ABBA - The Complete Recordings Sessions, page 106. Verulam Publishing Ltd (13 October 1994). . .

Citations

References
Complete results

To hear the Fanfare of the Championships

External links

IIHF World Ice Hockey Championships at SVT's open archive (including the 1981 tournament) 

IIHF Men's World Ice Hockey Championships
World Championships
World
1981
April 1981 sports events in Europe
International sports competitions in Gothenburg
International sports competitions in Stockholm
1980s in Stockholm
1980s in Gothenburg
March 1981 sports events in Europe
International ice hockey competitions hosted by Italy
International ice hockey competitions hosted by China
1980–81 in Italian ice hockey
1980–81 in Chinese ice hockey
Sports competitions in Beijing
1980s in Beijing